The Office for International Military Cooperation of the Central Military Commission is the chief organ under the Central Military Commission of the People's Republic of China for coordinating the People's Liberation Army's relationships with foreign militaries. It grew out of the PLA's Foreign Affairs Office, founded in 1951. It was founded on January 11, 2016, under Xi Jinping's military reforms. Its first director was Rear Admiral Guan Youfei.

See also 

 Central Military Commission (China)
 Ministry of National Defense (China)

References 

Central Military Commission (China)
2016 establishments in China
Ministry of National Defense (PRC)